Otto Carl Alfred Moschkau (1848-1912) was a German philatelist and local historian. In 2021 he was retrospectively named as one of the fathers of philately.

Selected publications 
 Führer durch die Städte Bautzen, Bischofswerda, Camenz, Löbau, Herrnhut, Görlitz, Lauban, Zittau und deren Umgebungen. Dresden 1872 (Digitised version)
 Löbau und dessen Umgebung – ein Führer durch diese alte Vierstadt, auf den Löbauer Berg, Cottmar, Rothstein, Sonneberg, Horken und in die Scala, Dresden 1872 (Digitised version)
 Die von den Oberlausitzer Sechsstädten eroberten und zerstörten Raubburgen der Lausitz, Schlesiens und Böhmens historisch und topographisch beschrieben. Selbstverlag, Zittau 1873 (Digitised version)
 Der Oybin bei Zittau. Seine Beschreibung, Geschichte und Sagen; nebst Führer durch Zittau, auf den Töpfer, Ameisenberg, Brandstein, Carlsfried und Weißbachthal, Pferdeberg, Hochwald, Nonnenklunzen, Lausche u.s.w. Zittau 1875 (Digitised version)
 Führer durch die Oberlausitz, Verlag Louis Senf, Leipzig 1877 (Digitised version)
 Der Carolathurm auf dem Hochwalde bei Zittau. Zittau um 1879 (Digitised version)
 Die Burg Oybin bei Zittau topographisch und historisch beschrieben. Senf, Leipzig 1879 (Digitised version)
 Führer zu den interessantesten Raubburgen der Oberlausitz und Böhmens. Pahl, Zittau 1879 (Digitised version)
 Goethe und Karl August auf dem Oybin bei Zittau vom 28. bis 29. September 1790. Senf, Leipzig 1879 (Digitised version)
 Führer durch die Oberlausitz mit besonderer Berücksichtigung des Zittauer Gebirges (Oybin, Hochwald, Lausche, Isarkamm etc.) und des angrenzenden Böhmens, Leipzig 1880 (Digitised version)
 Archiv für Topographie und Geschichte des Oybin und seiner Umgebung. mehrere Bände, Oybin 1881ff. (Digitised version)
 Der Oybin in vorhistorischer Zeit. Ein Beitrag zur Geschichte des Oybin und des Zittauer Gebirges. Oybin 1882 (Digitised version)
 Burg Tollenstein in Böhmen. Topographie und urkundliche Geschichte. Rumburg 1882 (Digitised version)
 Oybin-Chronik. Urkundliche Geschichte von Burg, Cölestinerkloster und Dorf Oybin bei Zittau. Leipa 1884 (Digitised version)
 Das Kirchlein am Oybin. Menzel, Zittau 1884 (Digitised version)
 Zittau und seine Umgebung. ein Führer durch Zittau, seine nächste Umgebung, in das Zittauer Gebirge und das nördliche Böhmen etc. Zittau 1893 (Digitised version)

References

External links 

1848 births
1912 deaths
Philatelic authors
German philatelists
German-language writers
German local historians